is a Japanese baseball player. He won a bronze medal at the 1992 Summer Olympics.

External links
Koji Tokunaga Biography and Olympic Results | Olympics at Sports-Reference.com

Baseball players at the 1992 Summer Olympics
Olympic baseball players of Japan
1968 births
People from Tokyo
Living people
Olympic medalists in baseball

Medalists at the 1992 Summer Olympics
Olympic bronze medalists for Japan